Revelstoke Mountain Resort (RMR) is a ski resort on Mount Mackenzie, just outside Revelstoke, British Columbia in Canada. It is owned by Northland Properties.

Currently, the resort has a  vertical drop, the longest vertical descent of any ski resort in North America. In terms of size, it is about the same as other major resorts, such as Breckenridge and Panorama, and about a third the size of Whistler-Blackcomb. When completed, it will have , which will make it the largest in North America.

History
Mount Mackenzie and the surrounding area has hosted a number of skiing operations for many years. Starting in the late 1960s a single two-person lift has been operational on the lower slopes, forming the basis of a resort known as Powder Springs. More recently, both Sno-Cat and Heliskiing operations have operated in the bowls on the upper elevations.

The resort opened for the first time on December 21, 2007, with a gondola providing access to the mountain and a high speed quad known as The Stoke lapping trails on the upper portion of Mount MacKenzie. It was thought to be the biggest North American ski resort debut in twenty years. However, the event was overshadowed by the death of an Edmonton ski instructor who disappeared on the mountain's "Jalapeno" run and whose body was found in a tree well three days later on Christmas Day.

During the summer of 2008, further trail cutting in the "North Bowl" area extended the skiable area and added a number of expert runs and glades. The Ripper, a second high speed quad, was added in 2008. The gondola was extended down the hill in December 2008, from the original base area to the new village area further down the hill.

In December 2019, a fixed grip quad known as Stellar was opened. The lift carries 1,800 people per hour and has a 3-minute ride time, servicing a new learning pod and making it possible to access The Ripper without having to ride The Stoke.

Construction
In order to build the local economy, the City of Revelstoke started the process of finding outside investors to dramatically expand the ski area and build a large complex at the base of the mountain. Funding was eventually secured from a group of private investors that appear to have since organized as Revelstoke Mountain Resort. The Government of Canada and Government of British Columbia are also involved, but it is not clear if they have a financial stake – BC is reported to have sold them some Crown Land but is apparently otherwise uninvolved. The development was priced at $1 billion in total, and an agreement among the major parties was signed on 20 March 2005. The complete project is expected to take fifteen years to complete.

Construction began in late 2005 with the completion of a road allowing access to most of the mountain. Construction of the first five ski trails started at the top of the existing 2-person chairlift at 1100 m, extending up to 1350 m. The chairlift was removed and replaced by a new eight-person gondola, running from the original "base" area to the mid-mountain area, while a new four-person high-speed chairlift ran from that point almost to the top of the mountain. There are 2 on-mountain dining options, Makenzie Outpost, at the top of Revelation gondola, and Revelation Lodge at mid-mountain.

Lifts

The hill is accessed via the Revelation Gondola which rises from the base area through the mid-mountain station and allows access to the upper lifts. Two high speed quads and a fixed grip quad operate above the gondola. The Stoke services the middle peak, while The Ripper provides access to the North Bowl. A magic carpet next to the Mid-Mountain Lodge serves a small beginner slope, while Stellar provides a learning pod at the MacKenzie Outpost. Stellar also provides direct access from the gondola to The Ripper.

A smaller fixed-grip double (The Powder Slug - a relic from the old Powder Springs) was removed in 2008 after the first season of RMR.

The ski lifts at RMR can enable access to North America's most vertical feet of lift accessed terrain.

Terrain Aspects
North: 26%
West: 44%
East: 4%
South: 26%
Reference:

Events
From the 2009/2010 season, RMR is the host for the Canadian Championships of the Freeskiing World Tour, the largest competitive Big Mountain competition. By hosting this event annually, Revelstoke Mountain Resort joins other mountain resorts such as Kirkwood, Snowbird, Palisades Tahoe, and Telluride on the World Tour, helping add to Revelstoke's reputation for big mountain terrain.

Future plans
The Master Plan calls for the eventual construction of as many as 25 lifts in total, both in the currently opened western face of the mountain, as well as the bowls to the south currently served by the cat-ski operations.

See also
List of ski areas and resorts in Canada

References

External links
revelstokemountainresort.com - official link

Northland Properties
Ski areas and resorts in British Columbia
Tourism in British Columbia
Revelstoke, British Columbia